Castanho (meaning brown) is a common surname in Portuguese.
 Abraham Castanho (17th century), Spanish poet
 Bianca Castanho (1979), Brazilian actress
 José Carlos Castanho de Almeida (1930–2022), Brazilian Roman Catholic prelate
 Klara Castanho (2000), Brazilian actress and singer
 Luiz Castanho de Almeida (1904–1981), Brazilian historian
 Thiago Castanho (1975), Brazilian guitarist, record producer, painter and sculptor

Portuguese-language surnames